The 18th Stinkers Bad Movie Awards were released by the Hastings Bad Cinema Society in 1996 to honour the worst films the film industry had to offer in 1995. When asked about their picks for the five worst movies of the 1990s, founders Mike Lancaster and Ray Wright both selected It's Pat for their lists. Lancaster also included Kids. While It's Pat received three nominations (one of which was a win), Kids got only a mere dishonourable mention for Worst Picture.

Listed as follows are the different categories with their respective winners and nominees, including Worst Picture and its dishonourable mentions, which are films that were considered for Worst Picture but ultimately failed to make the final ballot (30 total). The most notable change this year is swapping out Worst Resurrection of a TV Show temporarily for Most Painfully Unfunny Comedy. Both categories would appear next year, along with all the other categories listed below. All winners are highlighted.

Winners and Nominees

Worst Picture

Dishonourable Mentions 

 Assassins (Warner Bros.)
 Clueless (Paramount)
 Congo (Paramount)
 Cutthroat Island (MGM/UA)
 Destiny Turns on the Radio (Savoy)
 Dr. Jekyll and Ms. Hyde (Savoy)
 Fair Game (Warner Bros.)
 First Knight (Sony)
 Four Rooms (Miramax)
 Jade (Paramount)
 Jerky Boys: The Movie (Touchstone, Caravan)
 Johnny Mnemonic (Sony)
 Judge Dredd (Hollywood)
 Jury Duty (Sony)
 Kids (Shining Excalibur)
 Mallrats (Gramercy)
 Man of the House (Disney)
 Mortal Kombat (New Line)
 Operation Dumbo Drop (Disney)
 Safe (Sony)
 The Scarlet Letter (Hollywood)
 Something to Talk About (Warner Bros.)
 Species (MGM)
 Stuart Saves His Family (Paramount)
 Tank Girl (United Artists)
 To Wong Foo, Thanks For Everything, Julie Newmar (Universal)
 Tommy Boy (Paramount)
 Under Siege 2: Dark Territory (Warner Bros.)
 Vampire in Brooklyn (Paramount)
 Village of the Damned (Universal)

Other Categories

References 

Stinkers Bad Movie Awards
1995 film awards